Bartleby is the title character in Herman Melville's short story "Bartleby, the Scrivener".

Bartleby may also refer to:
Bartleby (1970 film), a British film starring Thorley Walters
Bartleby (1976 film), a French production
Bartleby (2001 film), an American film starring Crispin Glover and David Paymer
Bartleby, the protagonist of the movie Accepted
Bartleby, a character in the Jeff Smith comic Bone
 Bartleby, a character in the Kevin Smith movie Dogma
Bartleby.com, an e-text archive